This is a list of all episodes of the television Western series Have Gun – Will Travel. The series originally aired Saturdays at 9:30–10:00 pm (EST) on CBS.

Series overview

Episodes

Season 1 (1957–58)

Season 2 (1958–59)

Season 3 (1959–60)

Season 4 (1960–61)

Season 5 (1961–62)

Season 6 (1962–63)

Notes

Have Gun - Will Travel